Emunim (lit. the faithful) is a moshav in central Israel. Located near Ashdod, it falls under the jurisdiction of Be'er Tuvia Regional Council.

History
The moshav was founded in 1950 by Jewish immigrants and refugees from Egypt, on the land of the depopulated Palestinian town of Bayt Daras. The main source of income for the residents was animal and arable farming.

Like many of the other moshavim in the area, its name is symbolic and taken from the Tanakh, Psalm 31:23: "the Lord preserves the faithful".

References

Moshavim
Populated places established in 1950
Populated places in Southern District (Israel)
1950 establishments in Israel
Egyptian-Jewish culture in Israel